Adient plc is an American Irish-domiciled company that manufactures automotive seating for customers worldwide and is based in Plymouth, Michigan, United States.  , Adient was the world's largest auto seat manufacturer, accounting for one-third of the markets global revenue and providing components for 25 million vehicles.

History 
Adient was founded as a spin-off from Johnson Controls in 2016, establishing its legal domicile in Dublin, Ireland. Johnson Controls had entered the automotive seating business in 1985 by acquiring Hoover Universal. In September 2017, Adient acquired the Oak Park, Michigan-based automotive seat manufacturer Futuris from Clearlake Capital, which added 15 facilities in Asia and North America, including one facility based in Newark, California, and which was anticipated to increase the company's revenue by $0.5 billion annually.

, Adient employed 86,000 people across 250 manufacturing/assembly plants, in 34 countries. In 2016, Adient announced plans to move its global operating headquarters to the Marquette Building in Detroit, but canceled those plans as of June 2018.

In January 2018, a joint venture was formed by Adient (50.01%) and Boeing (49.99%) to develop and manufacture airliner seats for new installations or retrofit, a $4.5 billion market in 2017 which will grow to $6 billion by 2026, to be based in Kaiserslautern near Frankfurt and distributed by Boeing subsidiary Aviall, with its customer service center in Seattle.

In February 2020 Adient announced it agreed to sell its 30% stake in Yanfeng Global Automotive Interior Systems to Yanfeng Automotive Trim Systems US$379 million.

In March 2020, Adient entered into an agreement to sell its automotive fabrics manufacturing business to Sage Automotive Interiors for $175 million.

Notes

References

External links
 
 

Corporate spin-offs
Manufacturing companies established in 2016
Johnson Controls
Auto parts suppliers of Ireland
Manufacturing companies based in Michigan
Companies listed on the New York Stock Exchange
Manufacturing companies based in Dublin (city)
Tax inversions